Alex Witt Reports (formerly Weekends with Alex Witt) is a news program on MSNBC anchored by Alex Witt. The program airs in the morning and in the afternoon on both Saturdays and Sundays in the Eastern Time Zone.

Witt previously anchored the weekend edition of MSNBC Live. When MSNBC announced that regular contributor Chris Hayes would be hosting a new weekend talk show, she was given a branded program as part of the network's new weekend morning lineup. Weekends with Alex Witt and Up with Chris Hayes debuted on September 17, 2011.

In a 2015 realignment of MSNBC's daytime lineup, Weekends was removed from the lineup, but Witt maintained her time slot under the MSNBC Live banner. The Weekends branding was later reinstated. In March 2021, it was announced that the program would be rebranded as Alex Witt Reports, reintegrating it with  the MSNBC Live programs under a new standard brand.

References

External links
Official site

2010s American television news shows
2011 American television series debuts
2012 American television series endings
MSNBC original programming
English-language television shows